Lissy  is an Indian actress, who has primarily appeared in Malayalam films. She made her cinematic debut in 1982 with Ithiri Neram Othiri Karyam. Her notable roles include Odaruthammava Aalariyam (1984), Mutharamkunnu P.O. (1985), Boeing Boeing (1985), Thalavattom (1986), Vikram (1986) and Chithram (1988).

Early life
Lissy was born as the only child to Nellikaattil Pappachan (Varkey) and Aleyamma at Pazhanganad, Pukkattupadi, Kochi in Kerala. Her parents got divorced when she was very young and she was brought up by her mother Aleyamma. Lissy did her studies at St. Teresa's School and College. She was a bright student and scored good marks during her schooling. She started her career at the age of 15 when she was studying for pre-university degree. She had to discontinue her studies to concentrate on her career.

Career
Her debut into films happened in the early '80s and in a short period of time, she became one of the top heroines of the time. Though Lissy had paired with almost all the top heroes of the eighties, it was along with Mohanlal and Mukesh, that she was able to create magic on screen. Even at the peak of her career, she acted as sister roles, the girl next door, and as the heroine's friend. Known for her stunning and mesmerizing looks, she was able to grab the hearts of viewers. Along with Malayalam films, Lissy also had appeared in several Tamil, and Telugu films. Lissy is most remembered for her roles in Chithram, Thalavattom, Odaruthammava Alariyam, Mutharamkunnu P.O. and Boeing Boeing. As she stated in an interview with manam magazine she was introduced to Tamil films by Kamal Haasan as his heroine in his home production, Vikram.

Personal life
She fell in love with the noted film director Priyadarshan, and married him on 13 December 1990. After marriage, Lissy gave up acting and adopted the name Lakshmi for religious reasons. After the birth of their son, Lissy converted to Hindu religion from Catholicism.

Lissy filed for divorce on 1 December 2014 in a Chennai family court and was divorced on 1 September 2016, after 26 years of marriage.

Filmography

Malayalam

Telugu

Tamil

References

External links

Lizzy at MSI

People from Ernakulam district
Kerala State Film Award winners
Former Roman Catholics
Indian former Christians
Converts to Hinduism from Christianity
Indian film actresses
Actresses from Kochi
Actresses in Malayalam cinema
20th-century Indian actresses
21st-century Indian actresses
Child actresses in Malayalam cinema
Actresses in Telugu cinema
Actresses in Tamil cinema
Living people
St. Teresa's College alumni
Converts to Hinduism
Indian Hindus
Year of birth missing (living people)